The 1975 Austrian motorcycle Grand Prix was the second round of the 1975 Grand Prix motorcycle racing season. It took place on the weekend of 2–4 May 1975 at the Salzburgring.

500cc classification

References

Austrian motorcycle Grand Prix
Austrian
Motorcycle Grand Prix
Austrian Motorcycle Grand Prix